This article features the 1997 UEFA European Under-18 Championship qualifying stage. Matches were played 1996 through 1997. Two qualifying rounds were organised and seven teams qualified for the main tournament, joining host Iceland.

Round 1

Group 1
All matches were played in the Netherlands.

Group 2
All matches were played in Sweden.

Group 3
All matches were played in Norway.

Group 4
All matches were played in Ireland.

Group 5
All matches were played in England.

Group 6

Group 7
All matches were played in Slovakia

Group 8
All matches were played in Switzerland.

Group 9
All matches were played in Luxembourg.

Group 10
All matches were played in Spain.

Group 11
All matches were played in Romania.

Group 12

Group 13
All matches were played in Cyprus.

Group 14
All matches were played in Bulgaria.

Round 2

|}

See also
 1997 UEFA European Under-18 Championship

External links
Results by RSSSF

UEFA European Under-19 Championship qualification
Qual